Talha ibn Tahir (طلحة بن طاهر; died 828) was the Tahirid governor of Khurasan from 822 until his death.

In 822, Tahir ibn Husayn, who had taken control of Khurasan the previous year, died. According to some reports, the caliph Al-Ma'mun at first supported replacing him with Talha's brother Abdallah ibn Tahir al-Khurasani, but the latter was occupied with rebels in the Jazira, so Talha was confirmed as governor of eastern Iran instead.

Talha's rule is mostly known for his campaigns in Sistan, another province under his rule, against the local Kharijites, who were led by a Hamza ibn Adharak. Fighting between the two continued until 828, when both Hamza and Talha died. Talha was succeeded in his post by his brother Abdallah.

References
 

828 deaths
Tahirid governors of Khurasan
9th-century rulers in Asia
Amirs of Nishapur
Year of birth unknown
9th-century Iranian people
9th-century people from the Abbasid Caliphate